Synaphea spinulosa is a species of small shrub in the flowering plant family Proteaceae. It is endemic to Western Australia. Together with Acacia truncata, it was the first Australian endemic to be scientifically described and named, and the specimen upon which that description is based is the oldest extant specimen of an Australian plant, and very likely among the first Australian plant specimens ever collected.

Description
The leaves are deeply divided into three lobes, and each lobe is usually also divided into three. The ultimate lobes are usually triangular, and even these usually end in up to three sharp points. The leaf lamina does not lie flat but is concave.

Taxonomy

Taxonomic history

Synaphea spinulosa bears the distinction of holding several 'firsts' in Australia botanical history. Together with Acacia truncata it was the first Australian endemic to be scientifically described and named, and the specimen upon which that description is based is the oldest extant specimen of an Australian plant, and very likely among the first Australian plant specimens ever collected.

Nothing is known of the original collection of the specimen, except that it was necessarily collected before publication of the species description in 1768. Prior to this, the only known visit by Europeans to an area where S. spinulosa occurs was the voyage of Dutch mariner Willem de Vlamingh, who explored Rottnest Island and the Swan River in December 1696 and January 1697 respectively. It is therefore very likely, but not proven, that the specimen was collected during that voyage, and thus predates by nearly three years the oldest authenticated collection of Australian plants, that made by William Dampier in 1699. It is known that Dutch botanist Nicolaas Witsen asked Vlamingh to collect plants for him during the voyage, and it is recorded that Vlamingh returned to Holland with plants, fruits, and wood samples. However, according to Mabberley,  at least one of the two specimens came from Christiaan Kleijnhoff who had established a botanic garden in Java (which is where Burman describes S. spinulosa  as coming from - "ex Java"). 

In 1768, Dutch botanist Nicolaas Laurens Burman acquired the two specimens and published names, descriptions and illustrations of them in his Flora Indica. S. spinulosa was wrongly identified as a Javanese fern, and named Polypodium spinulosum; A. truncata was similarly misidentified and misnamed. The specimen of A. truncata is now lost, but the specimen of S. spinulosa is extant, and currently lodged in the Herbarium of the Conservatoire et Jardin botaniques de la Ville de Genève (CJB) in Geneva, Switzerland; it is  among the oldest extant botanical specimens of an Australian endemic. (Some older specimens collected by William Dampier, e.g. Swainsona formosa, still exist at the Druce Herbarium in Oxford, but were not described.) 

The next known collection of S. spinulosa was made in December 1801, when King George Sound was visited by HMS Investigator under the command of Matthew Flinders. On board were botanist Robert Brown, botanical artist Ferdinand Bauer, and gardener Peter Good. All three men gathered material for Brown's specimen collection, including specimens of S. spinulosa. Neither Brown's nor Good's diary can be used to assign a precise location or date for the first collection of this species, but one of Brown's specimen slips is dated "Decr 19 1801".

Brown, however, did not recognise the species as distinct; in his specimen collection, specimens of S. spinulosa are attributed to S. polymorpha, and when he eventually published the genus in his 1810 monograph On the Proteaceae of Jussieu, he assigned Burman's Polypodium spinulosum to S. petiolaris.

In 1919, American botanist Elmer Drew Merrill identified Burman's Polypodium spinulosum with S. polymorpha. Claiming priority for Burman's name, he transferred P. spinulosum into Synaphea as S. spinulosa, relegating S. polymorpha to synonymy. This synonymy was accepted for many years, though the more established name S. polymorpha was preferred. The species was finally recognised as distinct in 1995 when Alex George divided S. polymorpha into several species in his treatment of the genus for the Flora of Australia series of monographs.

Relationships within Synaphea
The only published infrageneric arrangement of Synaphea is that provided by Alex George for the Flora of Australia series. In George's arrangement, Synaphea is divided into four sections. S. spinulosa is placed at the front of S. sect. Synaphea, by far the largest section with 44 members, because of its "entire to emarginate or shortly horned stigma":
Synaphea
S. sect. SynapheaS. spinulosa — S. endothrix — S. media — S. sparsiflora — S. canaliculata — S. cervifolia — S. quartzitica — S. incurva — S. polymorpha — S. intricata — S. parviflora — S. tripartita — S. constricta — S. bifurcata — S. oligantha — S. flexuosa — S. divaricata — S. interioris — S. tamminensis — S. rangiferops — S. lesuerensis — S. aephynsa — S. gracillima — S. drummondii — S. acutiloba — S. stenoloba — S. odocoileops — S. recurva — S. grandis — S. decorticans — S. panhesya — S. boyaginensis — S. whicherensis — S. preissii — S. obtusata — S. platyphylla — S. nexosa — S. petiolaris — S. otiostigma — S. flabelliformis — S. damopsis — S. cuneata — S. macrophylla — S. decumbens — S. xela
S. sect. Bicornis (4 species)
S. sect. Oulopha (1 species)
S. sect. Pinnata (1 species)
(1 species unassigned)

Subspecies
Three subspecies are currently recognised:
 S. spinulosa subsp. major has longer flowers than the other species.
 S. spinulosa subsp. borealis has a shorter flower than S. spinulosa subsp. major, and a smaller fruit and is less hairy than S. spinulosa subsp. spinulosa.
 S. spinulosa subsp. spinulosa' has a shorter flower than S. spinulosa subsp. major, and larger fruit and more hair than S. spinulosa subsp. major''.
George notes that the species is highly variable, and there are several unstudied collections exhibiting interesting variability.

Distribution and habitat
Endemic to Western Australia, it is widespread in the Southwest Botanic Province, and almost never found outside it.

References

External links

 
 
 

spinulosa
Proteales of Australia
Eudicots of Western Australia
Taxa named by Nicolaas Laurens Burman
Plants described in 1768